In enzymology, a 3-hydroxyacyl-CoA dehydrogenase is an enzyme that catalyzes the chemical reaction

(S)-3-hydroxyacyl-CoA + NAD+  3-oxoacyl-CoA + NADH + H+

Thus, the two substrates of this enzyme are (S)-3-hydroxyacyl-CoA and NAD+, whereas its 3 products are 3-oxoacyl-CoA, NADH, and H+.

This enzyme belongs to the family of oxidoreductases, to be specific those acting on the CH-OH group of donor with NAD+ or NADP+ as acceptor.

Isozymes 

In humans, the following genes encode proteins with 3-hydroxyacyl-CoA dehydrogenase activity:
 HADH – Hydroxyacyl-Coenzyme A dehydrogenase
 HSD17B10 – 3-Hydroxyacyl-CoA dehydrogenase type-2
 EHHADH – Peroxisomal bifunctional enzyme
 HSD17B4 – Peroxisomal multifunctional enzyme type 2

Function 

3-Hydroxyacyl CoA dehydrogenase is classified as an oxidoreductase. It is involved in fatty acid metabolic processes. Specifically it catalyzes the third step of beta oxidation; the oxidation of L-3-hydroxyacyl CoA by NAD+. The reaction converts the hydroxyl group into a keto group.

The end product is 3-ketoacyl CoA.

Metabolic pathways 

This enzyme participates in 8 metabolic pathways:

 fatty acid elongation in mitochondria
 fatty acid metabolism
 valine, leucine and isoleucine degradation
 lysine degradation
 tryptophan metabolism
 benzoate degradation via coa ligation
 butanoate metabolism
 caprolactam degradation

Nomenclature 

The systematic name of this enzyme class is (S)-3-hydroxyacyl-CoA:NAD+ oxidoreductase. Other names in common use include:

 1-specific DPN-linked beta-hydroxybutyric dehydrogenase
 3-hydroxyacetyl-coenzyme A dehydrogenase
 3-hydroxyacyl coenzyme A dehydrogenase
 3-hydroxybutyryl-CoA dehydrogenase
 3-hydroxyisobutyryl-CoA dehydrogenase
 3-keto reductase
 3-L-hydroxyacyl-CoA dehydrogenase
 3beta-hydroxyacyl coenzyme A dehydrogenase
 beta-hydroxy acid dehydrogenase
 beta-hydroxyacyl CoA dehydrogenase
 beta-hydroxyacyl dehydrogenase
 beta-hydroxyacyl-coenzyme A synthetase
 beta-hydroxyacylcoenzyme A dehydrogenase
 beta-hydroxybutyrylcoenzyme A dehydrogenase
 beta-keto-reductase
 beta-ketoacyl-CoA reductase
 L-3-hydroxyacyl CoA dehydrogenase
 L-3-hydroxyacyl coenzyme A dehydrogenase

Structural studies 

References 

 
 
 
 

EC 1.1.1
NADH-dependent enzymes
Enzymes of known structure